Coeleumenes is an indomalayan genus of potter wasps. The following species are classified under this genus:

 Coeleumenes burmanicus (Bingham, 1897) 
 Coeleumenes impavidus (Bingham, 1897)
 Coeleumenes indianus (Saussure, 1855) 
 Coeleumenes multicolor (Giordani Soika, 1935) 
 Coeleumenes ruficrus Vecht, 1963
 Coeleumenes rufopetiolatus (Wickward, 1908)
 Coeleumenes secundus (Dalla Torre, 1889)
 Coeleumenes thoracicus (Sonan, 1939) 
 Coeleumenes timorensis Vecht, 1963
 Coeleumenes vindex (Smith, 1859)

References

Potter wasps